George Canning, 1st Baron Garvagh FRS (15 November 1778 – 20 August 1840) was an Anglo-Irish Member of Parliament.

Garvagh was the son of Paul Canning and the grandson of Stratford Canning of Garvagh in County Londonderry. Prime Minister George Canning and the diplomat Stratford Canning, 1st Viscount Stratford de Redcliffe, were his first cousins. He was elected to the House of Commons for Sligo Borough in 1806, a seat he held until 1812, and then represented Petersfield from 1812 to 1820. On 1 February 1810 he was elected a Fellow of the Royal Society and on 28 October 1818 he was raised to the Peerage of Ireland as Baron Garvagh, of Garvagh in the County of Londonderry. Lord Garvagh later served as Lord Lieutenant of County Londonderry between 1831 and 1840.  He died while staying at a hotel in Châlons-sur-Marne (now renamed Châlons-en-Champagne) in August 1840, aged 61, and was succeeded in the barony by his son Charles Henry Spencer George Canning.

References
Kidd, Charles, Williamson, David (editors). Debrett's Peerage and Baronetage (1990 edition). New York: St Martin's Press, 1990

External links 
 

1778 births
1840 deaths
Barons in the Peerage of Ireland
Peers of Ireland created by George III
Fellows of the Royal Society
Lord-Lieutenants of County Londonderry
Members of the Parliament of the United Kingdom for English constituencies
Canning, George
Canning, George
Canning, George
Canning, George
UK MPs 1818–1820
UK MPs who were granted peerages